Austin White (born August 2, 1997) is an American professional wrestler and bodybuilder. He is currently signed to WWE, where he performs on the Raw brand under the ring name Austin Theory and is the current WWE United States Champion in his second reign.

Prior to joining WWE, he wrestled on the independent circuit, including several promotions under the World Wrestling Network umbrella, such as Full Impact Pro (FIP) and Evolve – along the way winning the WWN Championship, FIP World Heavyweight Championship and the Evolve Championship.

In WWE, he is a two-time United States Champion and the winner of the 2022 Men's Money in the Bank ladder match.

Early life
Austin White was born on August 2, 1997, in the Atlanta suburb of McDonough, Georgia. He was a fan of professional wrestling in his youth, citing John Cena as a huge influence, and had dreams of joining WWE since he was 8 years old. In 2015, he placed first in the NPC Georgia Bodybuilding Championship, Teen Men category when he was 17.

Professional wrestling career

Early years (2016–2019)
He made his professional wrestling debut on May 5, 2016, under the ring name Austin Theory, defeating A. R. Fox at a WWA4 event to win the WWA4 Heavyweight Championship. He continued to work in events around the Georgia area. He made his Progress Wrestling debut on April 1, 2017, at a Progress and Evolve joint show, losing to Keith Lee in a four way match involving Jason Kincaid and Blaster McMassive.

On August 12, 2016, Theory made his World Wrestling Network debut at Full Impact Pro (FIP)'s Heatstroke. He made his Evolve debut at Evolve 78 on February 24, 2017, defeating Darby Allin. Theory acquired Priscilla Kelly as a valet, and on December 18 at Evolve 97, Theory defeated Fred Yehi to win the FIP World Heavyweight Championship. He retained the title against Yehi on January 13, 2018, in an "Anything Goes" match. On February 17 at Evolve 100, Theory failed to win the Evolve Championship against Zack Sabre Jr.. At Evolve 103 on April 6, Theory defeated Keith Lee to win the WWN Championship, ending Lee's 175 day reign. At Evolve 106 on June 23, Theory lost the WWN Championship to Joey Janela. On September 30 at Accelerate, he lost the FIP World Heavyweight Championship to Anthony Henry. At Evolve 117 on December 15, Theory defeated Fabian Aichner and Roderick Strong in a triple threat match to win the Evolve Championship. At Evolve 139 on November 9, 2019, he lost the title to Josh Briggs.

On June 16, 2018, Theory made his debut for Mexican promotion The Crash Lucha Libre, losing to Rey Horus. On March 2, 2019, Theory defeated Willie Mack, Bárbaro Cavernario and Sansón to win The Crash Heavyweight Championship. On June 14, Theory made his Consejo Mundial de Lucha Libre debut representing The Crash, teaming with Carístico and Volador Jr. to defeat Rush and La Peste Negra (Bárbaro Cavernario and Negro Casas).

WWE
Prior to his signing with the company, he participated in a WWE tryout in February 2018. On April 8, during day 4 of WrestleMania Axxess, Theory retained his WWN Championship against Marcel Barthel.

NXT and Raw debuts (2019–2020)
On August 10, 2019, Theory was shown on-screen in the crowd at NXT TakeOver: Toronto. Five days later, it was announced that he signed a contract with WWE and would report to the WWE Performance Center. On the December 25 episode of NXT, Theory made his in-ring debut, accepting Roderick Strong's NXT North American Championship open challenge in a losing effort. On the January 8, 2020 episode of NXT, Theory achieved his first victory by defeating Joaquin Wilde.

Theory appeared on the March 30 episode of Raw as an associate of Zelina Vega, establishing himself as a heel. Theory teamed with Angel Garza and Seth Rollins in a losing effort to Kevin Owens and Raw Tag Team Champions The Street Profits (Angelo Dawkins and Montez Ford). On the second night of WrestleMania 36 on April 5, Theory and Garza unsuccessfully challenged The Street Profits for the Raw Tag Team Championship. The following night on Raw, Theory and Garza lost to The Street Profits in a rematch for the titles. After defeating Akira Tozawa on the April 13 episode of Raw, Vega's other associates, Garza and Andrade joined him in beating down Tozawa as all three posed together, confirming their status as a faction. However, on the May 18 episode of Raw, he was attacked by Andrade and Garza after accidentally costing them a tag team match against Apollo Crews and Kevin Owens, kicking him out of the faction. Later that same night, he assisted Seth Rollins and Murphy in attacking Aleister Black, formally joining Rollins' group as a disciple. However, following the June 22 episode of Raw, he stopped appearing with Rollins and Murphy.

The Way (2020–2021)

On the August 26 episode of NXT, Theory returned to television by interrupting Bronson Reed, moving back to the brand. He made his in-ring return on the September 8 episode of NXT, losing to Reed. At NXT TakeOver: WarGames on December 6, Theory helped Johnny Gargano win his third NXT North American Championship. He then appeared on the December 9 episode of NXT to reveal he was part of a villainous faction called The Way with Gargano, his real life wife Candice LeRae, and Indi Hartwell. On December 30, Theory won the 2020 NXT Year-End Award for Future Star of NXT.

In January 2021, Theory and Gargano competed in the 2021 Dusty Rhodes Tag Team Classic, losing to Kushida and Leon Ruff in the first round. For the next few months, Theory helped Gargano retain the North American Championship against numerous opponents. Following a loss to Kyle O'Reilly on the July 20 episode of NXT, Theory took an absence from NXT television, until he returned on the premiere of NXT 2.0, attending the wedding of Indi Hartwell and Dexter Lumis in his final NXT appearance.

Storyline with Mr. McMahon (2021–2022)
As part of the 2021 Draft, Theory was drafted to the Raw brand. On the October 4 episode of Raw, Theory returned to the brand by attacking Jeff Hardy and defeated him on the next two episodes of Raw. At Survivor Series on November 21, Theory was a part of Team Raw, eliminating Sheamus before he was eliminated by Hardy, but his team won the match against Team SmackDown. The following night on Raw, it was revealed that Theory took Cleopatra's Egg from Mr. McMahon, leading to McMahon to reward Theory a WWE Championship match against Big E in the main event for "showing intestinal fortitude", which he lost.

On the January 17, 2022, episode of Raw, after defeating Finn Bálor, McMahon rewarded Theory a spot in the Royal Rumble match. At the namesake event on January 29, Theory entered his first Royal Rumble match at #3, lasting 22 minutes before he was eliminated by AJ Styles. On the January 31 episode of Raw, Theory defeated Kevin Owens in a Elimination Chamber qualifying match. At Elimination Chamber on February 19, Theory failed to win the WWE Championship after he was last pinned by Brock Lesnar in a match also involving Seth "Freakin" Rollins, Styles, Riddle and defending champion Bobby Lashley. Towards the end of the match, Lesnar and Theory generated buzz when Lesnar performed the F-5 on Theory from the top of the Elimination Chamber pod down to the floor. On the February 28 episode of Raw, Theory bribed McMahon into having himself accompany him to his interview with Pat McAfee to no avail. On the March 4 episode of SmackDown, Theory confronted McAfee and announced he would be his opponent at WrestleMania 38. On the second night of the event on April 3, Theory lost to McAfee, but helped McMahon defeat McAfee in the subsequent fight that ensued until they were stunned by Stone Cold Steve Austin.

United States Champion and Mr. Money in the Bank (2022–present)
The following night on Raw, Theory and The Usos defeated RK-Bro (Randy Orton and Riddle) and Finn Bálor after Theory pinned Bálor, earning the chance to challenge for his United States Championship. In a backstage segment the following week, Theory announced he and Mr. McMahon decided that the name Austin did not suit him anymore, dropping the first name and going by Theory. On the April 18 episode of Raw, Theory defeated Bálor to win the title for the first time in his career, becoming the second youngest United States Champion in the title's history and the youngest champion under the WWE banner. On the May 9 episode of Raw, Theory defended the championship against Cody Rhodes, losing the match by disqualification after Seth "Freakin" Rollins attacked Rhodes, but retained the title. Theory retained the title against Mustafa Ali on the May 30 episode of Raw, and in a rematch at Hell in a Cell on June 5.

At Money in the Bank on July 2, Theory lost the United States Championship to Bobby Lashley, ending his reign at 75 days. Later that night, he was added to and won the Men's Money in the Bank ladder match, making him the youngest superstar to win the Money in the Bank contract in WWE history, as well as being the first Money in the Bank winner to lose a title and win the contract on the same night. At SummerSlam on July 30, Theory failed to regain the United States Championship in a rematch against Lashley. Later that night, he attempted to cash in his Money in the Bank contract during the Undisputed WWE Universal Championship Last Man Standing match between Brock Lesnar and Roman Reigns, but was hit with an F-5 by Lesnar before he could officially cash in. At Clash at the Castle on September 3 on the pre-show, with his ring name reverted to Austin Theory, he and Alpha Academy (Chad Gable and Otis) lost to The Street Profits (Montez Ford and Angelo Dawkins) and Madcap Moss. Later that night, he again attempted to cash in his Money in the Bank contract during the main event, only to be knocked out by Tyson Fury before he could officially do so. On the November 7 episode of Raw, Theory cashed in his Money in the Bank contract on Rollins for the United States Championship but was unsuccessful, partially due to interference from Bobby Lashley.

At Survivor Series WarGames on November 26, Theory defeated Rollins and Lashley in a triple threat match to win his second United States Championship. On the December 5 episode of Raw, Theory retained the title against Mustafa Ali by disqualification after being attacked by the returning Dolph Ziggler. On the January 2, 2023, episode of Raw, Theory retained the title against Rollins, as well as Lashley in a No Disqualification match at Raw Is XXX on January 23 after interference from the returning Lesnar. At the Royal Rumble on January 28, Theory entered at #25 but was eliminated by eventual winner Cody Rhodes. On February 18 at Elimination Chamber, Theory successfully defended the title against Bronson Reed, Damian Priest, Johnny Gargano, Montez Ford, and Seth Rollins in an Elimination Chamber match, marking the first time the title was contested inside the namesake structure. In a press conference after the event, Theory issued an open challenge for the title, which was answered by Edge. On the following episode of Raw, Theory retained the title against Edge after interference from Finn Bálor. On the March 6 episode of Raw, Theory challenged the returning John Cena to a match for the title at WrestleMania 39, which Cena accepted.

Championships and accomplishments

Bodybuilding
National Physique Committee
NPC Georgia Teen, Men's bodybuilding championship winner (1 time)

Professional wrestling

The Crash Lucha Libre
The Crash Heavyweight Championship (1 time)
Evolve
Evolve Championship (1 time)
Full Impact Pro
FIP World Heavyweight Championship (1 time)
Fire Star Pro Wrestling
FSPW Heavyweight Championship (2 times)
Mucha Lucha Atlanta
MLA Global Championship (1 time)
National Championship Wrestling
NCW Heavyweight Championship (1 time)
Peachstate Wrestling Alliance
PWA Heritage Championship (1 time)
Pro Wrestling Illustrated
 Ranked No. 80 of the top 500 singles wrestlers in the PWI 500 in 2019
World Wrestling Network
WWN Championship (2 times)
WWA4
WWA4 Heavyweight Championship (1 time)
 WWE
 WWE United States Championship (2 times, current)
 Men's Money in the Bank (2022)
 NXT Year-End Award for Future Star of NXT (2020)
Xtreme Wrestling Alliance
XWA Heavyweight Championship (1 time)

References

External links

 
 
 
 

1997 births
21st-century professional wrestlers
American bodybuilders
American male professional wrestlers
Living people
NWA/WCW/WWE United States Heavyweight Champions
People from McDonough, Georgia
Professional wrestlers from Georgia (U.S. state)
Sportspeople from Georgia (U.S. state)